Rodolfo Félix Valdés (May 22, 1922 - May 21, 2012) was a Mexican politician. He was the Governor of Sonora from 1985 until 1991. He previously held posts in the Ministry of Communications and Works.

Valdés died on May 21, 2012, aged 86.

References

1922 births
2012 deaths
Politicians from Sonora
Mexican Secretaries of Communications and Transportation
Mexican engineers
Governors of Sonora
National Autonomous University of Mexico alumni
20th-century Mexican politicians
People from Nacozari de García Municipality